Hançerli can refer to:

 Hançerli, Ergani
 Hançerli, Mudanya